E-Clear was a British payment processor that provided merchant accounts for companies, allowing them to accept credit cards. E-Clear specialised in the travel industry in the United Kingdom.

Members of the company's board included Elias Elia, Derek Tullett and Sir Edward du Cann.

Formed in 2002 and based in Mayfair, City of Westminster, the company was based in Britain, but owned by a parent company registered in Cyprus, and its chief executive Elias Elia is a Greek Cypriot.

History
The company was formed in 2002.

In 2007, Deutsche Bank announced the end of its agreement for card processing with E-Clear. As a result, E-Clear began buying shares in NordFinanz, a small loss-making bank in Bremen. By 2009, E-Clear owned 97% of the shares in the bank. In 2010, it sold the stake.

In January 2010, the company was put into administration.

References

Companies based in the City of Westminster
Financial services companies of the United Kingdom
Defunct companies of the United Kingdom
Financial services companies established in 2002
Financial services companies disestablished in 2010
British companies established in 2002
British companies disestablished in 2010
2002 establishments in the United Kingdom
2010 disestablishments in the United Kingdom
Privately held companies of the United Kingdom
Payment service providers